Louwrien Wijers (born 1941 in Aalten, Netherlands) is a Dutch artist and writer working in Ferwert. She was involved with the Fluxus art movement and worked with Joseph Beuys from 1968 through 1986. Like Beuys, she considers writing and speaking as sculpture. She makes what she calls "mental sculpture" as well as material sculpture. From 1965 on she has written on art for the Museum Journaal, Algemeen Handelsblad, Hitweek, het Financieele Dagblad and in several international books, magazines and publications. In 1970 she began making art.

Her collection of interviews 1978–1987 with Joseph Beuys, Andy Warhol, the Dalai Lama, Robert Filliou, Sogyal Rinpoche, David Bohm, Rupert Sheldrake, Francisco Varela, Nam June Paik and Harish Johari came out in German as Schreiben als Plastik in 1992 and was published in English as Writing as Sculpture in 1996.

In 1990, Louwrien Wijers initiated her mental sculpture Art meets Science and Spirituality in a changing Economy, five days of panel meetings at the Stedelijk Museum Amsterdam. It brought together artists, scientists, spiritual leaders and economists; Robert Rauschenberg, David Bohm, the Dalai Lama and Stanislav Menshikov in Panel 1. John Cage, Ilya Prigogine, Huston Smith and Friedrich Wilhelm Christians in Panel 2. JCJ Vanderheyden, Francisco Varela, Mother Tessa Bielecki and J.M. Pinhero Neto in Panel 3. Lawrence Weiner, Rupert Sheldrake, Sogyal Rinpoche and Jean-Maxime Lêvêque in Panel 4. Marina Abramović, Fritjof Capra, Raimon Panikkar and Johan Witteveen in Panel 5.
Her accurate transcripts of all five panel meetings are published in Art meets Science and Spirituality in a changing Economy / From Competition to Compassion, Academy Editions, 1996.

Solo exhibitions
1972 Bathiliem Gallery, New York, U.S.A.
1973 Galerie im Goethe Institut, Amsterdam
1974 Galerie im Goethe Institut, Amsterdam 		
1982 Van Reekummuseum, Apeldoorn. Netherlands  
2003 Mijn Heyboertijd met Hannes van Es, Kunstruimte Wagemans, Beetsterzwaag, Netherlands
2011 Words to be framed, Galerie van Gelder, Amsterdam

Group exhibitions
1972 Galerie im Goethe Institut, Amsterdam
1982 ICA, Antwerpen
1992 Fodor Museum, Amsterdam		
1998 Artists for Tibet, Amsterdam 		
2003 Kunstruimte Wagemans, Beesterzwaag, Netherlands 	
2003 Biennale van Venetië, Utopia Station
2007 Cumulus, Kunstruimte NP40, Amsterdam, curator Marieke Bolhuis
2008 Kasteel Nienoord, Leek, Netherlands		
2011 Kunstruimte Wagemans, Nw Annerveen, Netherlands	
2013 The Temptation of AA Bronson, Witte de With, Rotterdam, Netherlands
2013 Onmogelijke Kunst op Solder, Museum8 in Ons LieveHeer op Solder, Amsterdam
2014 UMCG / Universitair Medisch Centrum Groningen, Groningen, Netherlands, with Ids Willemsma
2015 Postcards are to be looked at, Galerie van Gelder, Amsterdam 
2015 RongWrong/Amsterdam, solo booth at Brussels Art Fair, Brussels, Belgium
2015 Anarchic Situation, Kunstruimte Wagemans, Beetsterzwaag, Netherlands, curated by Marc Bijl
2016 Imagine Europe - In Search of New Narratives, BOZAR / Paleis voor Schone Kunsten, Brussels, Belgium
2017 Learn Tomorrow's Language, Amsterdamse Bos / Cure Park, Amsterdam
2017 Roll on, Roll on Phenomena, Van Eyck, Maastricht, curator Eloise Sweetman
2018 Psst... A Play On Gossip, Fondazione Giuliani, Rome, Italy
2019 Zeppelin Rooms, RongWrong, Amsterdam
2019 Moment VI: Kindness in a Time of Scarcity, Shimmer, Rotterdam

Publications
 Art meets Science and Spirituality in a changing Economy, SDU Publishers, 1990 
 Writing as Sculpture: 1978–1987. Academy Editions, 1996. 
 Ben d'Armagnac, In de serie Monografieën van Nederlandse Kunstenaars van het Prins Bernhard Fonds, Waanders Uitgevers, 1995. 
 Art Meets Science and Spirituality in a Changing Economy, From Competition to Compassion. Vch Pub, 1996.

References

External links
 Louwrien Wijers
 Galerie van Gelder

1941 births
Living people
Dutch contemporary artists
Dutch artists
Dutch writers
People from Bloemendaal